Homesick is the debut EP by American singer Trevor Daniel. It was released on October 11, 2018, by Alamo, Interscope and Internet Money Records.

Track listing 
Track listing adapted from the Tidal.

Charts

Weekly charts

Year-end charts

References 

2018 debut EPs
Trevor Daniel (singer) albums